Rupesh Laxman Mhatre is a member of the 13th Maharashtra Legislative Assembly. He represents the Bhiwandi East Assembly Constituency as member of Shiv Sena. He is a Shiv Sena politician from Thane district, Maharashtra.

Positions held
 2010: Elected to Maharashtra Legislative Assembly (1st term) 
 2014: Re-Elected to Maharashtra Legislative Assembly (2nd term)
 2015: Scheduled Tribes Welfare Committee (अनुसूचित जमाती कल्याण समिती) Pramukh Maharashtra Vidhan Mandal

See also
 Bhiwandi Lok Sabha constituency

References

External links
 Shiv Sena Official website

Maharashtra MLAs 2014–2019
Living people
Shiv Sena politicians
People from Thane district
Maharashtra MLAs 2009–2014
Marathi politicians
Politics of Thane district
Year of birth missing (living people)